Ipa is a genus of  dwarf spiders that was first described by Michael I. Saaristo in 2007.

Species
 it contains four species, found in Czech Republic, France, Kazakhstan, Mongolia, Russia, Slovakia, Turkey, Turkmenistan, and Ukraine:
Ipa keyserlingi (Ausserer, 1867) (type) – Europe, Caucasus
Ipa pepticus (Tanasevitch, 1988) – Kazakhstan, Turkmenistan, Mongolia
Ipa spasskyi (Tanasevitch, 1986) – Turkey, Ukraine, Russia (Europe, West Siberia), Kazakhstan
Ipa terrenus (L. Koch, 1879) – France, Czechia, Slovakia, Eastern Europe, Caucasus, Russia (Europe to South Siberia)

See also
 List of Linyphiidae species (I–P)

References

Araneomorphae genera
Linyphiidae
Spiders of Asia